The 1999 Scott Tournament of Hearts Canadian women's national curling championship, was played February 20 to 28 at the Charlottetown Civic Centre in Charlottetown, Prince Edward Island. In the final, Colleen Jones and her Nova Scotia team would win their first of five championships together (Jones' second). They defeated the defending champions (Team Canada) skipped by Cathy Borst in the final.

Teams

Standings

Results

Draw 1

Draw 2

Draw 3

Draw 4

Draw 5

Draw 6

Draw 7

Draw 8

Draw 9

Draw 10

Draw 11

Draw 12

Draw 13

Draw 14

Draw 15

Draw 16

Draw 17

Page playoffs

1 vs. 2

3 vs. 4

Semi-final

Final

References

Scotties Tournament of Hearts
Scott Tournament of Hearts
Scott Tournament Of Hearts, 1999
Curling competitions in Charlottetown
1999 in women's curling
February 1999 sports events in Canada